The 12 municipalities of the South Savo Region in Finland are divided on three sub-regions.



Mikkeli sub-region 
Hirvensalmi
Kangasniemi
Mikkeli (S:t Michel)
Mäntyharju
Pertunmaa
Puumala

Pieksämäki sub-region 
Juva
Pieksämäki

Savonlinna sub-region 
Enonkoski
Rantasalmi
Savonlinna (Nyslott)
Sulkava

See also 
Eastern Finland
Regions of Eastern Finland

External links